Torsten Gejl (born 30 January 1964, in Aarhus) is a Danish politician, who is a member of the Folketing for The Alternative political party. He was elected into parliament at the 2015 Danish general election. He is currently the group leader of The Alternative in the Folketing.

Political career
The gel was first elected into parliament in the 2015 election, where he received 1,433 votes. He was elected again in the 2019 election, receiving 1,383 votes. When four of the party's five Folketing members left the party on 9 March 2020 Torsten Gel was the only member of the party remaining. When Josephine Fock stepped down as leader of the party on 14 November 2020, Torsten Gejl was the ad interim leader of the party while the seat was vacant.

External links
 Biography on the website of the Danish Parliament (Folketinget)

References 

Living people
1964 births
People from Aarhus
The Alternative (Denmark) politicians
Members of the Folketing 2015–2019
Members of the Folketing 2019–2022
Members of the Folketing 2022–2026
Leaders of political parties in Denmark